Manfred Funke (born 22 August 1955) is a German weightlifter. He competed in the men's heavyweight I event at the 1980 Summer Olympics.

References

External links
 

1955 births
Living people
German male weightlifters
Olympic weightlifters of East Germany
Weightlifters at the 1980 Summer Olympics
People from Zwenkau
World Weightlifting Championships medalists
Sportspeople from Saxony
20th-century German people